Alun Walker (born 28 September 1990) is a Scottish rugby union player who played for English club Ealing Trailfinders in the RFU Championship.

Walker, who regularly benched for Edinburgh in the second half of season 2010–11 and duly made his debut, is in the second year of a degree course in Sports and Exercise Science at Heriot-Watt University.

Alun Walker was first-choice hooker during the 2016-17 season at Ealing Trailfinders. He enjoyed a fruitful scoring record of eight tries in 20 appearances, including two hat-tricks. The Scot responded to the challenge of the Championship and by making 17 appearances and scoring five tries in the 2015-16 season. The Scotland ‘A’ international captained Ealing Trailfinders in his first appearance, at home to Newport in pre-season when he also scored a try. He then played five matches and scored one try before his season was curtailed by a knee injury. The Scot joined on a two-year contract from Edinburgh having spent 2013-14 on loan at Nottingham. During his time in the East Midlands he played in both matches against Ealing Trailfinders. Walker has also represented Scotland at U18, U19 and U20 level and played for Melrose and Currie.

External links 
http://ealingtrailfinders1stxv.com/team/professional-squad/player/3njzgtqcjrs4

1990 births
Living people
Ealing Trailfinders Rugby Club players
Edinburgh Rugby players
Scottish rugby union players
People educated at North Berwick High School
Rugby union hookers